Uncimenia is a genus of cavibelonian solenogasters, shell-less, worm-like,  marine  mollusks.

References

Cavibelonia